The 2020 Music Awards Ceremony was held on 27 January 2020 at the Štark Arena in Belgrade. It was the second edition of Sky Music's annual award ceremony to recognize achievements in the regional music industry of former Yugoslavia for the eligibility year, which ran from January 1, 2018 to August 30, 2019. The event was hosted by Serbian presenter Galeb Nikačević, Macedonian singer Tamara Todevska and Croatian presenter Ana Radišić.

Part of the income was donated to UNICEF's gender equality programs in the west Balkans.

Performances

Categories and winners
Winners are listed first and are highlighted bold.

Public vote-based categories

Other awards

References

2020 music awards
Music festivals in Serbia